The Dublin Bay Mermaid is a one-design, wooden sailing dinghy originally designed for sailing in Dublin Bay, Ireland.

It is a 17-foot, half-decked, centreboard boat rigged as a Bermuda sloop, designed for the Dublin Bay Sailing Club in 1932 by John B. Kearney. The class still actively races with fleets in Dun Laoghaire, Rush, Skerries and Foynes.  The class usually have 5 Championship level events every year, these include the Munster Championship, the Leinster Championship, the National Championship, Skerries Regatta and Rush Regatta. Regular club racing also runs from May to September but can start as early as April and continue up until the end of October depending on the club. The national class association is the Mermaid Sailing Association.

The boats have a helm and 2 crew with a main sail, jib and spinnaker. The Olympic racing course is most commonly used at Championship level racing events and the class gets great levels of turnouts with a minimum of 20-30 boats always competing at the National Championship event which is held every year.

The table below lists the pre-1940 boats with their original names are.  The boats were not completed in numerical order as sail numbers were not allocated until some years after the first Mermaids were launched.:

Mermaids

See the table below for a full list of boats.  An * indicates that the number originally used on an earlier boat, since wrecked or broken up.  'W' and 'B' after a number indicates wrecked or broken up respectively.  A name or names in brackets indicates earlier name(s).  Boats highlighted in bold have won the National Championship.

External links
 Dublin Bay Mermaid Website
 Afloat Magazine Relevant Class articles

References 

Dinghies